Jarosław Zieliński (born 20 September 1960 in Szwajcaria) is a Polish politician. He was elected to the Sejm on 25 September 2005, getting 15780 votes in 24 Białystok district as a candidate from the Law and Justice list.

He was also a member of Sejm 2001-2005.

See also
Members of Polish Sejm 2005-2007

External links
Jarosław Zieliński - parliamentary page - includes declarations of interest, voting record, and transcripts of speeches.

Members of the Polish Sejm 2001–2005
Members of the Polish Sejm 2005–2007
Members of the Polish Sejm 2007–2011
Members of the Polish Sejm 2011–2015
Members of the Polish Sejm 2015–2019
Members of the Polish Sejm 2019–2023
Law and Justice politicians
1960 births
Living people
University of Gdańsk alumni
Solidarity (Polish trade union) activists
People from Suwałki